Gardner Heritage State Park was a history-focused state park located in the city of Gardner, Massachusetts. The facility, which occupied a former firehouse, offered exhibits on Gardner's industrial past as a center of furniture manufacturing. Opened in winter 1985, it was closed in 2002. Following its permanent closure, the Gardner Museum took possession of the center's artifacts and historic holdings.

References

2017 disestablishments in Massachusetts
Gardner, Massachusetts
Protected areas established in 1985
1985 establishments in Massachusetts
Protected areas disestablished in 2017